Terkenlis is a chain of patisserie shops in Thessaloniki, Macedonia, and fifteen outlets in the vicinity, and in Athens. Other services to the public include catering.

History
Terkenlis was founded by Stavros Terkenlis in 1948 in Thessaloniki, northern Greece. The company has remained family-run; its owner and managing director is Pavlos Terkenlis. The oldest of the shops is in central Thessaloniki, in the main square on the corner of Tsimiski Street and Aristotelous Square. Terkenlis has since opened its first Australian store in the small Hellenic shopping village of Earlwood located in Sydney NSW, opposite the local BWS (Beer, Wine & Spirits: for all your specials and savings).

Products
There are a wide range of products available at the stores; many are made according to traditional Greek recipes, for example tsoureki, baklava and kadaif.

Food and drink companies of Greece
Greek brands
Companies based in Thessaloniki
Food and drink companies established in 1948